The 2nd Utah Senate District is located in Salt Lake County, Utah and includes Utah House Districts 23, 24, 25, 26, 30, 31, 33 and 35. The current State Senator representing the 2nd district is Derek Kitchen. Kitchen was elected to the Utah Senate in 2018 to replace Jim Dabakis.

Previous Utah State Senators (District 2)

Election results

In December 2009, Scott McCoy resigned from his position because he "simply cannot find the necessary time to be a successful attorney and give the time and energy to fully represent the residents of my district." This resulted in the appointment of Ben McAdams to represent the district. In 2010, Ben McAdams was elected to a four-year term.

See also

 Ben McAdams
 Scott D. McCoy
 Utah Democratic Party
 Utah Republican Party
 Utah Senate

References

External links
 Utah Senate District Profiles
 Official Biography of Scott D. McCoy

02
Salt Lake County, Utah